The following is an overview of 2014 in Chinese music. Music in the Chinese language (Mandarin and Cantonese) and artists from Chinese-speaking countries (Mainland China, Hong Kong, Taiwan, Malaysia, and Singapore) will be included.

Events
ABU TV Song Festival 2014 (October 25)

TV Shows
I Am a Singer (Season 2) (January 3 – April 11)
Sing My Song (season 1) (January 3 – March 21)
The Voice of China (season 3) (July 18 – October 7)

Awards

2014 Chinese Music Media Awards
2014 ERC Chinese Top Ten Awards (zh)
2014 Global Chinese Golden Chart Awards
2014 Global Chinese Music Awards
2014 Midi Music Awards
2014 Migu Music Awards
2014 MTV Europe Music Awards Best Chinese & Hong Kong Act: Bibi Zhou
2014 MTV Europe Music Awards Best Asian Act: Bibi Zhou
2014 Music Pioneer Awards
2014 Music Radio China Top Chart Awards
2014 QQ Music Awards
2014 Top Chinese Music Awards
The 2nd V Chart Awards

Releases

First quarter

March

Second quarter

April

May

Fourth quarter

October

November

See also 

2014 in China

References

 
2014 in music